Bruno Bairros Collaço (born March 8, 1990 in São Leopoldo) is a Brazilian footballer who plays for Vila Nova as a left back.

Career 
On 9 August 2009 he debuted for Grêmio in a match against Grêmio Prudente Futebol.

References

External links 
 
 

Brazilian footballers
Brazilian expatriate footballers
Footballers at the 2007 Pan American Games
Campeonato Brasileiro Série A players
Campeonato Brasileiro Série B players
Grêmio Foot-Ball Porto Alegrense players
Associação Atlética Ponte Preta players
Goiás Esporte Clube players
Clube Náutico Capibaribe players
Associação Chapecoense de Futebol players
Joinville Esporte Clube players
FC Sochaux-Montbéliard players
Esporte Clube Juventude players
Grêmio Esportivo Brasil players
Paysandu Sport Club players
Expatriate footballers in France
Living people
1990 births
People from São Leopoldo
Association football fullbacks
Pan American Games competitors for Brazil
Sportspeople from Rio Grande do Sul